Hallicis clavicula is a moth in the family Blastobasidae. It is found in Costa Rica.

The length of the forewings is 4.6–5.7 mm. The forewings are brown intermixed with pale-brown scales and dark-brown scales. The hindwings are translucent pale brown, gradually darkening toward the apex.

Etymology
The specific epithet is derived from Latin clavicula (meaning a tendril of a vine) and refers to the tapering digitate process originating from the base of the valva of the genitalia, which terminates with a single seta.

References

Moths described in 2013
Blastobasidae